Hans de Koning (born 5 April 1960) is a Dutch professional football manager and former player. De Koning played as a goalkeeper.

Playing career
De Koning played for AZ'67 for ten years, before moving to Twente, where he became known as "Hansje de King" (Hans the King) and played 140 games in five seasons with the club. He was forced to retire in 1993 after suffering a serious injury during Fred Rutten's farewell match.

Managerial career
After retiring as a player, De Koning then became a goalkeeping coach for his former club AZ, also serving briefly as joint caretaker in 1997, and later on moved into head management at Eerste Divisie, making his debut at such role with Limburgish club Fortuna Sittard. De Koning then briefly served as interim coach of Dordrecht from March to July 2005 before being appointed at TOP Oss later that year until June 2010 when he was removed after he failed to save FC Oss from relegation to the newly established Topklasse level at the end of the 2009–10 season.

From July 2010, De Koning was in charge of Eerste Divisie club AGOVV Apeldoorn. In March 2011, it was announced that AGOVV and him had parted ways at the end of the season; De Koning was then unveiled later in May as new head coach of Helmond Sport for the 2011–12 season. On 21 April 2012, it was confirmed that he would be in charge of Eerste Divisie club Volendam for the 2012–13 season, signing a two-year deal.

Honours

Player
AZ
Eredivisie: 1980–81
KNVB Cup: 1977–78, 1980–81, 1981–82

References

1960 births
Living people
Dutch footballers
Dutch football managers
Association football goalkeepers
AZ Alkmaar managers
AZ Alkmaar players
FC Twente players
Eredivisie players
Footballers from Rotterdam
Fortuna Sittard managers
FC Dordrecht managers
TOP Oss managers
AGOVV Apeldoorn managers
Helmond Sport managers
FC Volendam managers
Go Ahead Eagles managers
VVV-Venlo managers
Eredivisie managers
Eerste Divisie managers
Fortuna Sittard non-playing staff
FC Twente non-playing staff
AZ Alkmaar non-playing staff